Cedar Creek Township is one of eleven townships in Lake County, Indiana. As of the 2010 census, its population was 12,097 and it contained 4,675 housing units.

History
Cedar Creek Township was established in 1839.

The Buckley Homestead was listed in the National Register of Historic Places in 1984.

Geography
The township includes most of the town of Lowell, as well the Census-designated Place Lake Dalecarlia.

Education
Cedar Creek Township, along with West Creek Township and Eagle Creek Township, is served by the Tri-Creek School Corporation which includes Lowell High School.

References

External links

Townships in Lake County, Indiana
Townships in Indiana
populated places established in 1839
1839 establishments in Indiana